The lieutenant governor of Idaho is a constitutional statewide elected office in the U.S. state of Idaho. According to the Idaho Constitution, the officeholder is elected to a four-year term.

The current lieutenant governor of Idaho is Republican Scott Bedke, who took office January 2, 2023.

Powers and duties

The power of the lieutenant governor of Idaho derives from Article IV, Sections 12 and 13 of the Idaho Constitution, which provides that the office is first in line of succession to the governor of Idaho.

It also dictates that the lieutenant governor serves as the presiding officer of the Idaho Senate. The lieutenant governorship has been a constitutional office in Idaho since statehood in 1890. Prior to 1946 the office was elected to two-year terms.

Idaho has had 43 lieutenant governors since 1890. Five people have served twice as Idaho Lieutenant Governor: O. E. Hailey (1927–1929; 1929–1931), G. P. Mix (1931–1933; 1935–1937), Charles C. Gossett (1937–1939; 1941–1943), Donald S. Whitehead (1939–1941; 1947–1951) and Jim Risch (2003–2006; 2007–2009).

List of lieutenant governors of Idaho

Passages

See also

Idaho gubernatorial elections
List of governors of Idaho

References

Idaho Statewide Elected Officers Historical Roster

 
Lieut